Craterellus elegans is a species of fungi in the family Cantharellaceae.

References

External links 

 
 Craterellus elegans at MycoBank

Cantharellaceae
Fungi described in 1931